The 1915 Penn Quakers football team was an American football team that represented the University of Pennsylvania in the 1915 college football season. In their third and final season under head coach George H. Brooke, the Quakers compiled a 3–5–2 record and outscored opponents by a total of 109 to 88.

Schedule

References

Penn
Penn Quakers football seasons
Penn Quakers football